Into The Fight 2018 was a professional wrestling event promoted by DDT Pro-Wrestling (DDT). It took place on February 25, 2018, in Tokyo, Japan, at the Korakuen Hall. The event aired domestically on Fighting TV Samurai and AbemaTV, and globally on DDT Universe, DDT's video-on-demand service.

Storylines
Into The Fight 2018 featured eight professional wrestling matches involving wrestlers from pre-existing scripted feuds and storylines. Wrestlers portrayed villains, heroes, or less distinguishable characters in the scripted events that built tension and culminated in a wrestling match or series of matches.

Event
During the event, Shuten-dōji (Kudo, Yukio Sakaguchi and Masahiro Takanashi) retained the KO-D 6-Man Tag Team Championship by defeating the team of Ryuichi Sekine, Ryota Nakatsu and Fuminori Abe from Pro-Wrestling Basara, a sub-brand of DDT.

In the next match, Yuko Miyamoto defended the DDT Extreme Division Championship against Shunma Katsumata in a hardcore match dubbed "Hardcore ＋ α". In this match, various weapons were placed around the ring and each competitor could choose an extra weapon to bring. Miyamoto chose a baseball bat coated in barbed wire, while Katsumata chose a box of thumbtacks.

The next match saw the participation of Naomichi Marufuji from Pro Wrestling Noah.

Results

Tag team rumble rules match

References

External links
The official DDT Pro-Wrestling website

2018
2018 in professional wrestling
Professional wrestling in Tokyo